Italo John "Babe" Caccia (October 3, 1917 – August 28, 2009) was an American college football and athletics administrator in Idaho.

Biography
Caccia was born in Pocatello, Idaho, in 1917. He played on the football teams of Idaho State University (ISU)—then known as Idaho–Southern Branch—in Pocatello in 1936 and 1937. He graduated from the University of Idaho in 1941, then served in the United States Navy during World War II. 

ISU football teams won six conference championships in the 14 seasons that Caccia was head coach. He later was the athletic director at ISU, from 1979 to 1986.

Caccia was inducted to the ISU athletic hall of fame in 1961. He died in Pocatello at age 91 in 2009.

Head coaching record

College football

References

External links
 Biography at North Idaho Athletic Hall of Fame
 Biography at Idaho's Hall of Fame

1917 births
2009 deaths
American football centers
American football linebackers
Edmonton Elks coaches
Idaho State Bengals baseball coaches
Idaho State Bengals football coaches
Idaho State Bengals football players
Idaho State Bengals wrestlers
Idaho Vandals football players
Idaho Vandals wrestlers
College wrestling coaches in the United States
High school football coaches in Idaho
United States Navy personnel of World War II
Sportspeople from Pocatello, Idaho
Coaches of American football from Idaho
Players of American football from Idaho
Baseball coaches from Idaho
American people of Italian descent